The Portrait of Cardinal Alessandro Farnese is a portrait of cardinal Alessandro Farnese (the future Pope Paul III) by Raphael, executed circa 1509-1511.

The cardinal posed near a window with a bright foreground, leading into a dark hall.  His delicate right hand holds a letter.

The painting resides at the Museo Nazionale di Capodimonte in Naples.

See also
List of paintings by Raphael

Notes

References

External links
Catalogue entry

1511 paintings
Farnese
16th-century portraits
Paintings in the collection of the Museo di Capodimonte